Oss tjuvar emellan eller En burk ananas is a Swedish comedy film from 1945 directed by Olof Molander. The film script was written by the Norwegian writer Helge Krog and the music was composed by Dag Wirén.

The film was shot at Filmstaden studios in Råsunda in the summer of 1944. It had its Swedish premiere at the Spegeln cinema in Stockholm on January 22, 1945.

Plot
Max Kvarne, who considers himself a kind of modern Robin Hood, hides £25,000 from a theft in London in a pineapple can. He travels back with it home to Stockholm. However, the police track him down and send out a detective, Arvid Zinder, to arrest him. Arvid is an old childhood friend of Max, and he has also been in love with his fiancée Irma for a long time. A lawyer, Barman, offers to become Max's defense lawyer, but his motive is really anything but noble. The barman goes to the stingy drug addict Daniel Bondsack's home, where Irma and Max have rented a room and where he thinks the money is hidden, to search the house. However, nobody knows where the pineapple can is anymore.

Cast

Lauritz Falk as Max Kvarne
Karin Ekelund as Irene Brambani 
Allan Bohlin as Arvid Zinder
Stig Järrel as Barman the lawyer
Ludde Gentzel as Daniel Bondsack
Erik Berglund as the detective 
Anna-Lisa Baude as Baroness Adelstolpe
Elsa Widborg as Mrs. Bondsack 
Hilding Gavle as Költzow
Douglas Håge as Detective Fransson
Nils Johannisson as Chief Detective Mattsson
Josua Bengtson as the plumber
Carl Ström as a blacksmith at the beer café
Åke Egnell as Olle, a student on the train
Olof Bergström as Gustav, Olle's friend
Stig Olin as Gustav, a young worker
Erik Forslund as an old worker at the beer café
Olof Krook as a cleaning worker
Erik Hell as Nisse, a sailor
Eva Dahlbeck as Astrid, his girlfriend
John Elfström as Constable Söder
Hartwig Fock as a taxi driver
Helge Andersson as a taxi driver
Helge Mauritz as the taxi driver at the police station
Wiktor Andersson as a garbage man at the dump

References

External links

Oss tjuvar emellan eller En burk ananas at the Swedish Film Database

1945 films
Swedish comedy films
1945 comedy films
1940s Swedish films